Alexander Peebles (10 January 1856 – 11 April 1934) was a New Zealand carrier, bush contractor, prospector, mine manager, farmer, local politician and businessman. He was born in Kingsbarns, Fife, Scotland in 1856. He became a member of the Coromandel County Council in the 1880s. He joined the Whakatane Road Board in 1899, and served as the first chairman of the Whakatane County Council from 1900.

References

1856 births
1934 deaths
New Zealand mining businesspeople
New Zealand gold prospectors
New Zealand businesspeople
People from Kingsbarns
Scottish emigrants to New Zealand
New Zealand city councillors
People from Whakatāne